The Yana Rhinoceros Horn Site (Yana RHS) is an Upper Palaeolithic archaeological site located near the lower Yana river in northeastern Siberia, Russia, north of the Arctic Circle in the far west of Beringia. It was discovered in 2001, after thawing and erosion exposed animal bones and artifacts. The site features a well-preserved cultural layer due to the cold conditions, and includes hundreds of animal bones and ivory pieces and numerous artifacts, which are indicative of sustained settlement and a relatively high level of technological development. With an estimated age of around 32,000 calibrated years before present, the site provides the earliest archaeological evidence for human settlement in this region, or anywhere north of the Arctic Circle, where people survived extreme conditions and hunted a wide range of fauna before the onset of the Last Glacial Maximum. The Yana site is perhaps the earliest unambiguous evidence of mammoth hunting by humans.

A 2019 study found that the remains of two young male humans discovered at the site represent a distinct archaeogenetic lineage, named 'Ancient North Siberians', who are distantly related to early West Eurasian hunter-gatherers.

Discovery 

In 1993, Russian geologist Mikhail Dashtzeren found a foreshaft of a spear made from the horn of a woolly rhinoceros in the Yana Valley. The discovery was made following thawing and erosion, which exposed numerous artifacts and animal bones near the site. Following this discovery, guided by Dashtzeren, an Upper Paleolithic site now known as Yana RHS was found in 2001 by archaeologist Vladimir Pitulko and colleagues. Excavations began in 2002.

Location 
The Yana RHS is located on an alluvial terrace near the left bank of the Yana river, north of the Arctic Circle, around 100 km south of the current river mouth. It is situated on the far west of the coastal lowland between the Yana River in the west and the Kolyma River in the east. The site consists of a complex of several roughly contemporaneous locations, separated by tens or hundreds of metres, over an area of more than 3500 square metres. The cultural layer is retained to a significant extent at three of these locations (Northern Point, Yana B, and Tums1). Three other locations (Upstream Point, ASN, and Southern Point) only yield surface finds. At an additional location, now known as 'Yana Mass Accumulation of Mammoth' (YMAM), a large number of mammoth remains, comprising over 1,000 mammoth bones, was discovered in 2008 by ivory hunters.

Yana RHS Localities

Date 
The site has been radiocarbon dated to approximately 32,000 calibrated years before present, before the Last Glacial Maximum and more than twice the age of any previously known human settlement of the Arctic. By the time of the Last Glacial Maximum, around 21,000 calibrated years before present, the archaeological culture represented by the Yana site had disappeared.

Faunal remains 

From the exposed cultural layer, hundreds of animal bones have been discovered at the site, from a wide variety of species, including many that are now extinct. The species include woolly rhinoceros  (Coelodonta antiquitatis), woolly mammoth (Mammuthus primigenius), Pleistocene hare (Lepus tanaiticus), steppe bison (Bison priscus), horse (Equus ferus caballus), musk ox (Ovibos moschatus), wolf (Canis lupus), polar fox (Vulpes lagopus), brown bear (Ursus arctos), Pleistocene lion (Panthera spelaea), wolverine (Gulo gulo), rock ptarmigan (Lagopus mutus hyperboreus), and reindeer (Rangifer tarandus), the last of which was probably the primary source of game. There is direct evidence of hunting steppe bison, reindeer, and brown bear at the site. The faunal remains suggest that the human settlers at this site had a diverse diet.

Some animals were probably hunted by humans for their fur. For instance, hare skeletons are found fully articulated, and were likely snared for their pelts, which are light and warm, rather than for meat.

Until 2008, an unexpectedly low number of mammoth bones were found at the site, compared to the enormous number of bones from other mammals, which was interpreted to mean that mammoths played a limited role in the subsistence strategy of humans at the site, and had not been hunted but instead were scavenged for ivory and bone, which was used for tools and building materials. This interpretation was revised when ivory hunters discovered an additional locality nearby at a location now known as 'Yana Mass Accumulation of Mammoth' (YMAM), containing around 1,000 mammoth bones representing at least 26 individuals, and grouped according to type. At the YMAM locality, over 95 per cent of the faunal remains are mammoth, compared to around 50 per cent at Yana-B and only 3.3 per cent at Northern Point. Recent studies suggest that there is convincing evidence of sporadic mammoth hunting, perhaps every few years, which is perhaps the earliest unambiguous evidence of mammoth hunting by humans. It is likely that obtaining mammoth meat was not the main purpose of mammoth hunting at this site. Instead, mammoths were hunted mainly for ivory and bone to use as building materials, tools, and fuel. It has been suggested that people of Yana RHS selectively hunted adolescent and young adult female mammoths with tusks of a particular size and shape, facilitating the manufacture of better hunting weapons.

Artifacts 

The Yana stone industry is flake-based, using a simple knapping technology. Blades are rare and microblades are absent. 
Large tools are mostly unifacial or incomplete bifaces. Among thousands of stone artifacts, no stone hunting tools have been discovered at the Yana site. Instead, hunting tools seem to have been made from bone and ivory. A variety of other stone tools have been found at the site, however, including chopping tools, scrapers, chisel-like tools, and a hammer stone.

Organic materials are well-preserved at the site due to the permafrost. Around 2,500 bone and ivory artefacts have been discovered at the site between 2002 and 2016. These include a rhinoceros horn foreshaft and two mammoth ivory foreshafts, which may have been straightened with a shaft-wrench, combined with heating or steaming. The foreshafts are said to be similar to those of the Clovis culture, and are the earliest examples of bi-beveled osseous rods, and also the only example found outside the Americas. There are also numerous ivory utensils, bone and ivory points, bone needles, a punch or an awl made from wolf bone, decorations and personal ornaments, and hunting weapons.

Non-local materials such as amber were used to manufacture ornaments such as pendants, suggesting high mobility or extensive trade networks.

Over 1,500 beads, some painted with red ochre, have been discovered at the site. These include rounded mammoth ivory beads and tubular beads made from Pleistocene hare bone. Pendants were found made from reindeer teeth and herbivore incisors, and occasionally carnivore canines, or more rarely from minerals such as amber, as well as one specimen made from anthraxolite shaped like a horse or mammoth head. Ivory hair band ornaments are also found. Three-dimensional objects are less common, but include 19 antler animal figurines, probably intended to represent mammoths, three ornamented ivory vessels, and two engraved mammoth tusks, possibly engraved with drawings of hunters or dancers.

The extent and density of the finds indicate a sustained and long-term human occupation of the site, and demonstrate a high level of cultural and technological development.

Relationship to other cultures 

Archaeologists have noted similarities between the Yana RHS and the Clovis culture, especially their respective stone industries and distinctive spear foreshafts.

Archaeogenetics 
Human teeth, dated to around 31,630 calibrated years before present, were found at the site, at the Northern Point locality. In a 2019 genetic study, DNA extracted from two of these teeth, which were found to be from two unrelated males, were found to represent a distinct archaeogenetic lineage which can be modelled as a mixture of early West Eurasian with an approximately 22% contribution from early East Asians, an ancestral lineage that the authors have named Ancient North Siberian (ANS), thought to have diversified around 38,000 years ago. The study argues that the so-called 'Mal'ta boy' ('MA-1') can be successfully modelled as a descendant of the ANS lineage, with a minor contribution from another lineage that is ancestrally related to Caucasus hunter-gatherers. The study also finds that the Ancient Palaeo-Siberian male from Kolyma ('Kolyma1')  can be modelled as a mixture of East Asian and ANS-related ancestry, similar to that found in Native Americans, but with a greater (75%) contribution of East Asian ancestry. Both individuals from the Yana site were found to belong to mitochondrial haplogroup U, and Y chromosome haplogroup P1. This is currently the oldest human genetic material retrieved from Siberia.

Notes

References 

Archaeological sites in Siberia